Groove Denied is a studio album by American rock musician Stephen Malkmus. It is the third album credited to Malkmus and the first to not feature his band The Jicks. It was released on March 15, 2019 by Matador Records and Domino Recording Company.

Background
Malkmus had been working on the album for 12 to 13 years. After he submitted the album in 2017, Matador Records' president and founder Chris Lombardi, who has been releasing Malkmus' records since Pavement's 1992 debut album Slanted and Enchanted, flew personally to Portland to inform Malkmus that it wasn't the right time to release the album. The album features Malkmus on all instruments and production and engineering.

Release and promotion
In an interview with the Chicago Tribune, Malkmus revealed that Groove Denied would be released in March 2019.

Matador teased the album on January 21, 2019. The album was officially announced the next day with the single "Viktor Borgia" and an accompanying music video. "Rushing the Acid Frat" was released on February 20, 2019. "Come Get Me" was released on March 6, 2019.

Track listing

Personnel
 Stephen Malkmus – all instruments, production, engineering, bass, organ, drum machines, Roland 2080, Memorymoog

Charts

References

2019 albums
Stephen Malkmus albums
Domino Recording Company albums
Matador Records albums